The accession of Bosnia and Herzegovina to the European Union is the stated aim of the present relations between the two entities. Bosnia and Herzegovina has been recognised by the EU as a "candidate country" for accession since the decision of the European Council in 2022 and is on the current agenda for future enlargement of the EU. Bosnia and Herzegovina takes part in the Stabilisation and Association Process and trade relations are regulated by an Interim Agreement.

Bosnia and Herzegovina formally applied for EU membership on 15 February 2016, following years of constitutional reforms and engagements with the Dayton Peace Agreement.  The failure of Bosnia to meet the conditions for the closure of the Office of the High Representative (OHR) in Bosnia and Herzegovina, including addressing state and military property ownership issues and implementing constitutional reforms, had prevented the country from submitting an application until 2016.

On 9 December 2016, Bosnia and Herzegovina received the accession questionnaire from the European Commission and the responses to the questionnaire were submitted in February 2018.  On 20 June 2018, the European Commission sent 655 follow-up questions to the Questionnaire. Presidency Chairman of Bosnia and Herzegovina at the time, Milorad Dodik, handed over the answers to the additional questions on 5 March 2019.  An opinion on Bosnia's application was published by the European Commission in May 2019. Twenty-two policy and political criteria questions were still unanswered when Bosnia and Herzegovina submitted its latest response on 5 March 2019. It remains a potential candidate country until it can successfully answer all of the questions on the European Commission's questionnaire sheet as well as "ensure the functioning of the Stabilisation and Association Parliamentary Committee and develop a national programme for the adoption of the EU acquis".

On 12 October 2022, the European Commission recommended that candidate status be granted to Bosnia and Herzegovina by the Council, on the understanding that a number of steps are taken. These include the fulfillment of 14 key concepts proposed by the EU that seek progress in the strengthening of democracy and human rights, as well as 8 further objectives that must be met: "judicial reform, prevention of conflicts of interests, fight against corruption and organised crime, border and migration management, media freedom, protection of journalists and the creation of preventive mechanisms against torture and ill-treatment." On 15 December 2022, the European Council officially granted candidacy status to Bosnia and Herzegovina.

Many observers estimate that Bosnia and Herzegovina is at the bottom in terms of EU integration among the Western Balkans states seeking EU membership.

Relations 
The EU established a regional approach to the Western Balkans in 1997, with political and economic conditionality criteria for the development of bilateral relations. The following year, an EU/Bosnia and Herzegovina Consultative Task Force was put in place to start the process. Since 2006, the task force has been replaced by the Reform Process Monitoring (RPM).

An Interim Agreement on Trade and Trade-related issues was signed and entered into force on 1 July 2008. The Interim Agreement was the legal framework for trade between Bosnia and the EU between 2008 and 2015.
Unilateral trade preferences ("Autonomous Trade Measures", ATM) were introduced by the EU for Bosnia and Herzegovina in the year 2000. Trade has increased since 2008 and EU products have been granted reciprocal preference in Bosnia and Herzegovina. The EU is the main trading partner of Bosnia and Herzegovina and 73.5% of exports from the country went to the EU in 2014, following Croatia's accession.

Financial Assistance 
In the 2007–2013 budgetary period, Bosnia and Herzegovina is a beneficiary of the Instrument for Pre-Accession Assistance (IPA) funds. As a "potential candidate country", Bosnia is allowed to finance projects under the first two IPA components, Transition Assistance and Institution Building and Cross-Border Cooperation. The eligibility for the three advanced IPA components will be conditional on Bosnia's acquisition of EU candidacy status and its implementation of a Decentralised Implementation System, streamlining administrative capacities in order to autonomously manage projects and disburse funds with only ex post Commission controls.

The priorities for IPA action for Bosnia are set in the 2008 European Partnership.

Bosnia and Herzegovina is currently receiving EUR 822 million of developmental aid until 2020 from the Instrument for Pre-Accession Assistance, a funding mechanism for EU candidate countries.

Visa liberalisation process 
On 1 January 2008, a visa facilitation and readmission agreement between Bosnia and Herzegovina and the EU entered into force.
Bosnia and Herzegovina took part in the dialogue for visa liberalisation with Schengen countries, launched by the European Commission on 26 May 2008.
On November 8, 2010 the Council of the European Union approved visa-free travel to the EU for citizens of Bosnia and Herzegovina.  The decision entered into force on 15 December 2010.

EU special representative 

Peter Sørensen took over the position of EUSR in Bosnia and Herzegovina from September 2011 until October 2014. His post was decoupled from the one of High Representative for Bosnia and Herzegovina (which will remain in the hands of Valentin Inzko), and merged with the one of Head of the EU Delegation to BiH, aiming at strengthening the EU pre-accession strategy for Bosnia and Herzegovina. He was replaced by Lars-Gunnar Wigemark.

CFSP and ESDP operations 
In 2004, the European Union Police Mission (EUPM) launched in Bosnia and Herzegovina constitutes the first European Security and Defence Policy (ESDP) mission. The same year, EUFOR Althea replaced NATO's SFOR mission.

Stabilisation and Association Process 
A Stabilisation and Association Process (SAP) for the five countries of the region, including Bosnia and Herzegovina, was proposed in 1999. In June 2000, the European Council in Feira recognised that all the SAP countries are "potential candidates" for EU membership. In November of the same year, the regional SAP process was launched at the Zagreb summit.

The process towards the signature of a Stabilisation and Association Agreement (SAA) began in 2003 with a feasibility study by the Commission on Bosnia and Herzegovina's capacity to implement the SAA. The same year, in June, the European Council in Thessaloniki confirmed the SAP as the main framework of the relations between the EU and the Western Balkans, recalling the perspective of accession for all the countries of the region.

The EU Council adopted a new European Partnership with Bosnia and Herzegovina on 18 February 2008, setting the short-term and mid-term priorities for EU assistance to Bosnia and Herzegovina through IPA funds.

Stabilisation and Association Agreement

Negotiations and signature 
Negotiations on a Stabilisation and Association Agreement (SAA) – required before applying for membership – started in 2005 and were originally expected to be finalised in late 2007. but negotiations stalled due to a disagreement over police reform.

The SAA was initialled on 4 December 2007 by caretaker Prime Minister Nikola Špirić.  The initialing came in the wake of successful negotiations by Miroslav Lajčák in regards to passing his new quorum rules laws and also the commitment of Bosnian and Herzegovinian politicians to implementing police reform. Following the adoption of the police reforms in April 2008, the agreement was signed on 16 June 2008. Reforms promised by the Prud Agreement would "build the ability of the State to meet the requirements of the EU integration process".

The blockage of the SAA 
The final EU state to ratify the SAA, France, did so in February 2011. The SAA should have entered into effect within 40 days but was frozen since Bosnia had not complied with its previous obligations, which would have led to the immediate suspension of the SAA. The obligations to be met by Bosnia before the SAA can come into force include the adoption of a law on state aids and a national census, and implementation of the Finci and Sejdic ruling of the ECHR requiring an amendment to the Constitution to allow members of minorities to be elected to the Presidency of Bosnia and Herzegovina and to gain seats in the House of Peoples. The EU has also required that the country create a single unified body to manage their relations with the EU.  The adoption of state laws on the issues above are prevented by the opposition of the government of the Republika Srpska, which considers such issues a matter of exclusive competence of the two entities of Bosnia and Herzegovina.

The Croatian initiative 
In March 2014 Croatian Foreign Minister Vesna Pusić at a session of the Council of the European Union proposed to other EU countries to grant Bosnia and Herzegovina the status of a Special EU Candidate Country in an aide-mémoire submitted during the meeting. Minister Pusić pointed out that Croatia does not suggest lowering the membership criteria but rather that member states should take a proactive stance in cooperation with Bosnia and Herzegovina and not just to put high criteria and then just wait for something to happen. Croatia has also proposed that implementation of the judgment in the case of Sejdić and Finci v. Bosnia and Herzegovina should not anymore be a prerequisite for Bosnia and Herzegovina's progress towards the EU, but that this issue, together with the issue of a new constitutional order of Bosnia and Herzegovina, should be resolved after Bosnia and Herzegovina gets the status of Special EU Candidate country in negotiating chapters 23 and 24.

The German-British initiative 
An initiative of the foreign ministers of Germany and the United Kingdom, Frank-Walter Steinmeier and Philip Hammond, respectively, for the acceleration of the Accession of Bosnia and Herzegovina to the European Union was announced at the so-called Aspen Initiative Meeting of Ministers of Foreign Affairs in late 2014. 
The two proposed that the SAA enter into force without first implementing the constitutional amendments required by Finci and Sejdic, provided that Bosnian authorities approve a declaration pledging their commitment to making the reforms required for European integration. The foreign ministers called on local Bosnian politicians to begin with necessary reforms as soon as possible after a new government is formed after the 2014 Bosnian general election.

The declaration was jointly signed by the tripartite presidency on 29 January, and approved by parliament on 23 February.  The Council of the EU approved the SAA's entry into force on 16 March 2015.  The SAA entered into force on 1 June 2015.

Domestic reactions to the German-British initiative 
 Željko Komšić, member of the Presidency of Bosnia and Herzegovina, expressed his support for the initiative at a meeting with the ambassadors of Germany and the United Kingdom.
 Milorad Dodik, former President of Republika Srpska and member of the Presidency, said he supports the initiative as long as it does not affect the constitutional jurisdiction of Republika Srpska.
 The Paneuropean Union of Bosnia and Herzegovina stated that it fully supports the initiative and the letter of the German and British foreign ministers addressed to the citizens of Bosnia and Herzegovina.

International reactions to the German-British initiative 
  High Representative for Bosnia and Herzegovina: The spokesman of the office of the High Representative for Bosnia and Herzegovina stated that the OHR welcomes any initiative that could unblock progress in reforms by increasing the functionality and efficiency of the state and thus speed up the progress of Bosnia and Herzegovina on its path towards the European Union.
  European Union: High Representative of the European Union for Foreign Affairs and Security Policy Federica Mogherini said that she highly appreciates the ideas presented in Berlin and that their aim is for Bosnia and Herzegovina again to begin to move towards European integration.
  United States of America: Jen Psaki, Spokesperson for the United States Department of State, said that the United States welcomes and supports the initiative for reform in Bosnia and Herzegovina, as released by the foreign ministers of Germany and the United Kingdom in Berlin.
  United Kingdom: Philip Hammond stated that regional support is vital for the initiative. He thanked Croatian foreign minister Vesna Pusić for her important work on this issue, and foreign minister of Serbia Ivica Dacic for his valuable cooperation and said that he was delighted they could join the meeting.
  Croatia: Vesna Pusić confirmed that Croatia supports the new German-British initiative for Bosnia and Herzegovina and that this initiative is similar to the original Croatian initiative. Pusić said that Croatia will not only support this initiative, but will also actively participate in it since it is important that Bosnia and Herzegovina is a successful and functional state.

Public opinion 
A 2019 poll sponsored by the National Democratic Institute found that there was overall support of accession to the EU of 75%. There was somewhat of a split over ethnic lines:

 Bosniaks - 88% support, 10% oppose.
 Croats - 75% support, 21% oppose.
 Serbs - 54% support, 39% oppose.

2022 events 
On 2 March 2022, two former High Representatives for Bosnia and Herzegovina Valentin Inzko and Christian Schwarz Schilling appealed to the EU for a faster accession of Bosnia and Herzegovina to it: "February 24, 2022 represents a dark day in the history of Europe, because there is a danger that this kind of aggression against a sovereign state could encourage other dictators to take similar steps". With these words, two former high representatives in Bosnia and Herzegovina, addressed the President of the European Commission, reacting to the dramatic development of the situation in Ukraine and the Russian army's attacks on civilian targets. 

On 12 June 2022, several political leaders in Bosnia and Herzegovina were called to Brussels on the request of Charles Michel, the president of the European Council. Most of the participants of the meeting in Brussels, which lasted more than eight hours, accepted the document: "Political Agreement on Principles for Ensuring a Functional BiH". The document, whose goals are ensuring a functional Bosnia and Herzegovina that advances on the European path, defines the commitment to preserve and build a peaceful, stable, sovereign and independent functional European Bosnia and Herzegovina. While also being committed to respecting the rule of law and conducting free and democratic elections. The importance of implementing reforms, which improve the European integration of BiH, is emphasized.

On 3 September 2022, the president of Slovenia Borut Pahor expressed his views "The first thing is for Serbia, Montenegro, North Macedonia and Albania to speed up the negotiations for joining the EU, for Bosnia and Herzegovina to receive candidate status by the end of Sunday, and for the EU to fulfill its obligation on visa liberalization". This caused confusion in Bosnia and Herzegovina since there was no previous mention from the Slovenian President regarding the candidate status of Bosnia and Herzegovina.

On 6 September 2022, Bosnia and Herzegovina signed an agreement with the European Union regarding it joining the European Civil Protection Mechanism. This agreement allowed Bosnia and Herzegovina to use all the benefits of EU members, to receive support and assistance in terms of education, equipment, schooling, but also to eliminate the consequences of natural disasters.

On 12 October 2022, the European Commission recommended that candidate status be granted to Bosnia and Herzegovina by the Council, on the understanding that a number of steps are taken:
 adoption of the integrity amendments in the existing law of the High Judicial and Prosecutorial Council;
 adoption of a new law on the High Judicial and Prosecutorial Council;
 adoption of the law on Courts of Bosnia and Herzegovina;
 adoption of the law on prevention of conflict of interest;
 enhancement on fight against corruption and organised crime;
 advance work on border management and migration management, as well as ensuring the functioning of the asylum system;
 ensuring prohibition of torture, notably the establishment of a national preventive mechanism against torture and ill-treatment;
 guaranteeing freedom of expression and freedom of the media;
 adoption of a national programme for the adoption of the EU acquis.

On 15 December 2022, the European Council officially granted candidacy status to Bosnia and Herzegovina.

Chronology of Relations with the European Union

Negotiations
Negotiation talks have not yet started. However, the European Commission has given an opinion on the status of various reforms since 2019.

See also
Yugoslavia–European Communities relations 
Bosnia and Herzegovina–Croatia relations
Euro-Slavism
Germany–United Kingdom Initiative for Bosnia and Herzegovina
Enlargement of the European Union
Potential enlargement of the European Union

References

External links
 European Commission, DG Enlargement, Bosnia and Herzegovina
 Text of the Stabilisation and Association Agreement between Bosnia and Herzegovina and the EU
 Text of the Interim Agreement on Trade and Trade-related issues
 Text of the European Partnership for Bosnia and Herzegovina
 Dominik Tolksdorf The Difficulties of the European Union in Supporting the Europeanization of Bosnia and Herzegovina EU Frontier Policy Paper, Budapest: Center for EU Enlargement Studies – Central European University, 2011

Bosnia and Herzegovina
Bosnia and Herzegovina–European Union relations